The Expropriation is a 1974 Chilean drama film directed by Chilean filmmaker Raúl Ruiz.

Cast
 Jaime Vadell as Agronomo Vidal
 Nemesio Antúnez as Don Nemesio
 Delfina Guzmán as Dona Delfina
 Luis Alarcón as Capataz Lucho
 Nicolas Eyzaguirre as Nicolas
 Rodrigo Maturana as Military Phantasm
 Joaquín Eyzaguirre as Joaquin

References

External links
 

1974 films
1970s Spanish-language films
1974 drama films
Chilean drama films
Films directed by Raúl Ruiz